Lucky Owners (幸運馬主) (foaled 27 September 1999) is a New Zealand thoroughbred racehorse who raced in Hong Kong. Sired by Danehill to dam Miss Priority, he won eight races in his career, including the Group One Hong Kong Mile and Hong Kong Derby. He was retired to stud in 2004.

Trivia
In Lucky Owners' debut race, on 11 January 2003, he was just a 15/1 outsider 30 minutes before the start of the race. Then his odds started to drop dramatically and became the 7/2 second favourite when the race started. Lucky Owners won this race.

References

Hong Kong Jockey Club Horse Profile
Widden Stud
Lucky Owners' pedigree

1999 racehorse births
Racehorses bred in New Zealand
Racehorses trained in Hong Kong
Thoroughbred family 6-e